The Zamfara Power Station is a hydro power plant located in Zamfara State, Nigeria. The 100 megawatt plant is situated on the Bunsuru River and was commissioned by former President Umaru Musa Yar'Adua.

Construction 
The hydro power plant was constructed by China Geo-Engineering Corporation and cost ₦19.2 billion to complete.

References 

Hydropower organizations
Hydroelectricity in Nigeria